Philip S. Yu (born  1952) is an American computer scientist and Professor in Information Technology at the University of Illinois at Chicago, known for his work in the field of data mining.

Biography 
Yu received his BS in electrical engineering from the National Taiwan University, and his MS and PhD also in electrical engineering from Stanford University in 1978, and received an MBA from New York University in 1982.

Yu started his career at Thomas J. Watson Research Center, where he eventually became manager of the Software Tools and Techniques group. Currently he is Distinguished Professor and Wexler Chair in Information Technology at the Department of Computer Science of the University of Illinois at Chicago

Yu holds over 300 US patents, is ACM Fellow and IEEE Fellow, is Editor-in-Chief of ACM Transactions on Knowledge Discovery from Data, chaired numerous conferences, and has been awarded several awards by IBM, the IEEE, and others.

Yu's research interests are in the fields of "data mining (especially on graph/network mining), social network, privacy preserving data publishing, data stream, database systems, and Internet applications and technologies." Yu is an ISI Highly Cited researcher. According to Google Scholar, Yu's H-index is among the ten highest in computer science.

Publications 
Yu published several books and over 650 articles. A selection: 
 Park, Jong Soo, Ming-Syan Chen, and Philip S. Yu. An effective hash-based algorithm for mining association rules. Vol. 24. No. 2. ACM, 1995.
 Chen, Ming-Syan, Jiawei Han, and Philip S. Yu. "Data mining: an overview from a database perspective." Knowledge and data Engineering, IEEE Transactions on 8.6 (1996): 866–883.
 Aggarwal, Charu C., et al. "Fast algorithms for projected clustering." ACM SIGMOD Record. Vol. 28. No. 2. ACM, 1999.
 Aggarwal, Charu C., et al. "A framework for clustering evolving data streams." Proceedings of the 29th international conference on Very large data bases-Volume 29. VLDB Endowment, 2003.
 Wang, Haixun, et al. "Mining concept-drifting data streams using ensemble classifiers." Proceedings of the ninth ACM SIGKDD international conference on Knowledge discovery and data mining. ACM, 2003.
 Ross Quinlan, Qiang Yang, Zhou Zhihua and David Hand et al. Top 10 algorithms in data mining. Knowledge and Information Systems 14.1: 1-37. 2008

References

External links 
 Philip S. Yu homepage at University of Illinois at Chicago

American computer scientists
American people of Taiwanese descent
University of Illinois Chicago faculty
National Taiwan University alumni
Stanford University School of Engineering alumni
New York University Stern School of Business alumni
Fellows of the Association for Computing Machinery
Fellow Members of the IEEE
IBM Research computer scientists
1950s births
Living people
Year of birth uncertain